Leptospermum petraeum is a rigid, spreading plant that is endemic to a restricted area of New South Wales. It has thin, flaky bark, young stems that are hairy at first, aromatic, elliptical leaves, relatively large white flowers and fruit that remain on the plant until it dies.

Description
The bark on older stems is thin and flaky, the younger stems hairy with an indistinct flange. There are broad, yellowish-brown bracts and bracteoles at the base of the flower bud.

Taxonomy and naming
Leptospermum petraeum was first formally described in 1989 by Joy Thompson in the journal Telopea, based on plant material she collected in Kanangra. The specific epithet (petraeum) is from a Latin word meaning "growing among rocks", referring to the habitat of this species.

Distribution and habitat
This tea-tree grows is only known from the type population where it grows on an exposed rocky outcrop.

References

petraeum
Myrtales of Australia
Flora of New South Wales
Plants described in 1989
Taxa named by Joy Thompson